The 1995–96 Polska Liga Hokejowa season was the 61st season of the Polska Liga Hokejowa, the top level of ice hockey in Poland. 12 teams participated in the league, and Podhale Nowy Targ won the championship.

Final round

Qualification round

Playoffs

External links
 Season on hockeyarchives.info

Polska Hokej Liga seasons
Polska
Polska